, also called as , is a motion picture production company in Japan with a distinguished large scale CG production department. The company is equipped with motion capture studio called "OPAKIS" in Odaiba, Tokyo.

The company started producing CG works in 1994 as a new section of TYO Image Enterprise. In 1997 Digital Frontier moved to Daikanyama and became a subsidiary of TYO Corporation then three years later it became corporate company Digital Frontier Inc. as it is known today. Its earlier works are Death Note (live action film) and Appleseed (CG film). In 2010, Digital Frontier’s parent company changed from TYO Inc. to Fields Corporation, which is specialized in planning and development, and sales of pachinko machines. The company has subsidiaries in Malaysia, Taiwan, and Japan.

The company created reveal trailers for Super Smash Bros. for Nintendo 3DS and Wii U and Super Smash Bros. Ultimate.

Works

TV Anime
2009: Viper's Creed (co-animated with AIC Spirits)
2017: Infini-T Force (co-animated with Tatsunoko Production)
2019: The Magnificent Kotobuki (production co-operation, animated by GEMBA)

Animated films
2002: Pokémon Heroes: Latias and Latios
2004: Appleseed
2006: Forest of Cats- Atagoal
2007: Appleseed Ex Machina
2008: Resident Evil: Degeneration
2009: Summer Wars
2011: Tekken: Blood Vengeance
2012: Resident Evil: Damnation
2012: Wolf Children
2016: Gantz: O
2018: Mirai
2018: Doraemon the Movie: Nobita's Treasure Island
2018: Infini-T Force the Movie: Farewell Gatchaman My Friend
2020: The Magnificent Kotobuki Complete Edition (production co-operation, animated by GEMBA)
2021: Belle

Live-action films
2005: Tokyo Zombie
2006: Death Note
2006: Death Note the Last name
2008: L Change the WorLd
2008: Snakes and Earrings (Hebi ni Piasu)
2011: Usotsuki Mi-kun to Kowareta Ma-chan
2011: GANTZ Part 1 & Part 2
2013: Jellyfish Eyes
2013: Tabidachi no Shimauta ~Jyugo no Haru~
2016: Death Note: Light Up the New World
2018: Bleach

Video game cutscenes and work assistance
2002: Resident Evil (2002 video game)
2005: Castlevania: Curse of Darkness
2005: Sengoku Basara
2005: Rogue Galaxy
2005: Killer7
2005: Fire Emblem: Path of Radiance
2006: Onimusha: Dawn of Dreams
2006: OneChanbara: Bikini Samurai Squad 
2007: Fire Emblem: Radiant Dawn, Lost Odyssey
2008: Metal Gear Solid 4: Guns of the Patriots
2008: White Knight Chronicles
2008: OneChanbara: Bikini Zombie Slayers
2008: Tekken 6: Bloodline Rebellion
2010: Vanquish
2010: Yakuza 4
2011: Tekken Tag Tournament 2
2011: Yakuza: Dead Souls
2012: Yakuza 5
2012: Binary Domain
2013: Metal Gear Rising: Revengeance
2014: Super Smash Bros. for Nintendo 3DS and Wii U
2014: Yakuza Ishin
2014: Metal Gear Solid V: Ground Zeroes
2015: Yakuza 0
2016: Pokémon Duel
2016: Yakuza Kiwami
2016: Yakuza 6
2017: Tekken 7
2017: Yakuza Kiwami 2
2018: Super Smash Bros. Ultimate
2018: Fist of the North Star: Lost Paradise
2019: Judgement
2019: Resident Evil 2 (2019 video game)
2019: Monkey King: Hero is Back
2020: Yakuza: Like a Dragon
2020: Resident Evil 3 (2020 video game)
2023: Like A Dragon: Ishin!
2023: Like A Dragon Gaiden: The Man Who Erased His Name
2024: Tekken 8
2024: Like A Dragon 8

References

External links
Frontier Pictures
Digital Frontier
Digital Frontier Inc.
Fields Corporation
 
 

Animation studios in Tokyo
Film production companies of Japan

Japanese animation studios
 Visual effects companies